Echinoderma is a genus of fungi in the family Agaricaceae. Its members were for a long time considered to belong to genus Lepiota and the group was then circumscribed by French mycologist Marcel Bon in 1981 as a subgenus of Cystolepiota before he raised it to generic status in 1991.

General
This genus belongs to a group of genera allied to Lepiota with a white spore print, free (or almost free) gills, stipe easily separable from the cap and having a partial veil.  Amongst the Agaricaceae it is characterized by the white spore powder, cap skin microscopically an epithelium with rounded cells, and a brownish cap and stipe, with brown scales.

The name comes from the Greek "echinos" (ἐχῖνος) meaning a hedgehog or sea-urchin and "derma" (δέρμα) meaning skin, referring to the spiny cap surface.  The noun "derma" is neuter and therefore if the species name is an adjective, it needs to take the neuter ending (example: Echinoderma asperum).

Species
Echinoderma asperum (Pers.) Bon 1991
Echinoderma boertmannii (Knudsen) Bon 1991
Echinoderma bonii C.E.Hermos. & Jul.Sánchez 1999
Echinoderma calcicola (Knudsen) Bon 1991
Echinoderma carinii (Bres.) Bon 1991
Echinoderma echinaceum (J.E.Lange) Bon 1991
Echinoderma efibulis (Knudsen) Bon 1991
Echinoderma hystrix (F.H.Møller & J.E.Lange) Bon 1991
Echinoderma jacobi (Vellinga & Knudsen) Gminder 2003
Echinoderma perplexum (Knudsen) Bon 1991
Echinoderma pseudoasperulum (Knudsen) Bon 1991
Echinoderma rubellum (Bres.) Migl. 2000

See also
List of Agaricaceae genera
List of Agaricales genera

References

Agaricaceae
Agaricales genera